Sproston is a village and civil parish in the unitary authority of Cheshire West and Chester and the ceremonial county of Cheshire, in the north-west of England, approximately 2 miles east of Middlewich.  The population of the civil parish taken at the 2011 census was 218.

Sproston is on the A54 road between Middlewich and Junction 18 of the M6 Motorway.

See also

Listed buildings in Sproston

References

External links

Sproston Parish Council Website The Website for Sproston Parish Council

Villages in Cheshire
Civil parishes in Cheshire